Kimberly Hardin is an African-American casting director and film producer. She is known for her casting of films, such as Hustle & Flow, Cadillac Records, Bloodline, Think Like a Man, and One Night in Miami.... She has also worked with several directors and producers, including John Singleton, Regina King, Kerry Washington, Lena Waithe, Bruna Papandrea, and Graham King.

Career 
Kimberly started her career with an internship in the office of Jane Jenkins and Janet Hirshenson. She got a job with Jaki Brown, who was casting a Sprite commercial. In 2017, she was invited to become a member of the Academy of Motion Pictures. Soon, she was interviewed for the first Academy Museum of Motion Pictures. In 2021, she was awarded the Independent Spirit Robert Altman Award and the Casting Society of America award for her work on One Night in Miami.

Credits

Casting director 
 Little Monsters (2019)
 If Not Now, When? (2019)
 Blindspotting (2018)
 Traffik (2018)
 Love Jacked (2018)
 Rebel (2017)
 Snowfall (2017)
 Michael Jackson: Searching for Neverland (2017)
 Think Like a Man (2012) 
 Madea Goes to Jail (2009)
 Not Easily Broken (2009)
 Cadillac Records (2008)
 First Sunday (2008)
 This Christmas (2007)
Hustle & Flow (2005)
Four Brothers (2005)
Black Snake Moan (2006)
Biker Boyz (2003)
2 Fast 2 Furious (2003)

Producer 
 Uncensored (2019 – 2020)
 The Perfect Match (2016)
 Bachelors (2015)
 Brotherly Love (2015)

Accolades

References

External links 

American film directors
American film producers
Living people
Year of birth missing (living people)